is one of the 18 wards of the city of Yokohama in Kanagawa Prefecture, Japan. As of 2010, the ward had an estimated population of 302,643 and a density of 8,610 persons per km². The total area was 35.14 km².

Geography
Aoba is located in eastern Kanagawa Prefecture, and in the northwest corner of the city of Yokohama. The area is largely flatland, with scattered small hills.

Surrounding municipalities
Midori Ward
Tsuzuki Ward
Kawasaki
Machida, Tokyo

History
The area around present-day Aoba Ward was formerly part of Tsutsuki District in Musashi Province. During the Edo period, it was a rural region classified as tenryō territory controlled directly by the Tokugawa shogunate, but administered through various hatamoto. After the Meiji Restoration, the area became part of the new Kanagawa Prefecture in 1868. During the Meiji period, the area was a center for sericulture. On April 1, 1939, the three villages within Tsutsuki District were annexed by the neighboring city of Yokohama, becoming part of Kōhoku-ku. 

In a major administrative reorganization of October 1, 1969, Kōhoku Ward was divided, and the present-day area of Aoba Ward became part of the new Midori-ku.  On November 6, 1994, Kōhoku and Midori Wards were recombined, then re-divided into four new Wards (Kōhoku, Midori, Tsuzuki and Aoba).  The North Branch of the Midori Ward Office in Ichigao became the new Aoba Ward Office.
The division and re-division of Wards has much to do with the development of northern Yokohama by railroad companies.  The opening of the Tōkyū Den-en-toshi Line and associated  residential communities led to the rapid suburban development in this region. This was followed by the  project in the 1980s and early 1990s. The core of the Kōhoku New Town became a significant commercial centre once the subway line extension between Shin-Yokohama and Azamino was completed in 1993.  The influx of new population resulted in the entire “Kōhoku New Town” being re-organized into the new Tsuzuki Ward.

Emblem of Aoba Ward
The emblem of Aoba Ward was officially announced on November 6, 1996, to commemorate the birth of Aoba Ward. The emblem was chosen from a number of designs submitted by residents. The trees and different shapes inside the green oval spell "AOBA." The hill symbolizes the geographic location of Aoba Ward. This emblem signifies the warmth that the nature gives to human beings.

Economy
Aoba Ward is largely a regional commercial center and bedroom community for central Yokohama, Kawasaki and Tokyo. The far-northern end of Aoba and the  valley area retained some residual agriculture into the 1990s, when real-estate developers converted much of the farmlands and orchards into subdivisions and condominiums.

Transportation

Railways
Tokyu Corporation - Tōkyū Den-en-toshi Line
  -  -  -  -  -  - 
Yokohama Minatomirai Railway-Yokohama Minatomirai Railway Kodomonokuni Line
  - 
 Yokohama City Transportation Bureau - Blue Line

Highways

 Yokohama Northwest Route

Prefecture roads
Kanagawa Prefecture Road 12
Kanagawa Prefecture Road 13
Kanagawa Prefecture Road 102
Kanagawa Prefecture Road 139
Kanagawa Prefecture Road 140

Education
Tertiary education:
Toin University of Yokohama
Nippon Sport Science University
Caritas Junior College
Yokohama College of Art and Design

 operates public elementary and junior high schools.

Kanagawa Prefectural Board of Education operates prefectural high schools.
 
 
 

Public junior high schools:

 Akanedai (あかね台)
 Aobadai (青葉台)
 Azamino (あざみ野)
 Ichigao (市ケ尾)
 Kamoshida (鴨志田)
 Midorigaoka (緑が丘)
 Mitakedai (みたけ台)
 Moegino (もえぎ野)
 Nara (奈良)
 Susukino (すすき野)
 Utsukushigaoka (美しが丘)
 Yamauchi (山内)
 Yamoto (谷本)

Public elementary schools:

 Aobadai (青葉台)
 Azamino Daiichi (No. 1) (あざみ野第一)
 Azamino Daini (No. 2) (あざみ野第二)
 Edanishi (West) (荏田西)
 Ekoda (荏子田)
 Enokigaoka (榎が丘)
 Fujigaoka (藤が丘)
 Ichigao (市ケ尾)
 Kamoshida Daiichi (鴨志田第一)
 Kamoshida Midori (鴨志田緑)
 Katsura (桂)
 Kenzan (嶮山)
 Kurogane (鉄)
 Kurosuda (黒須田)
 Mitakedai (みたけ台)
 Motoishikawa (元石川)
 Nara (奈良)
 Onda (恩田)
 Satsukigaoka (さつきが丘)
 Shinishikawa (新石川)
 Tana (田奈)
 Tsutsujigaoka (つつじが丘)
 Utsukushigaoka (美しが丘)
 Utsukushigaoka Higashi (East) (美しが丘東)
 Utsukushigaoka Nishi (美しが丘西)
 Yamauchi (山内)
 Yamoto (谷本)

Eda Elementary School (荏田小学校) and Nakagawa Nishi Elementary School (中川西小学校), outside of Aoba-ku, include portions of Aoba-ku in their attendance zones.

Local attractions
Kodomonokuni Theme Park

Noted people from Aoba Ward
Tomoya Nagase, singer, actor
Hiroshi Nakada, politician
Emi Wakui, actress

References
 Kato, Yuzo. Yokohama Past and Present. Yokohama City University (1990).

External links
Aoba Ward Office
City of Yokohama statistics

Wards of Yokohama